The canton of Moret-sur-Loing is a former French administrative division, located in the arrondissement of Fontainebleau, in the Seine-et-Marne département (Île-de-France région). It was disbanded following the French canton reorganisation which came into effect in March 2015.

Demographics

Composition 
The canton of Moret-sur-Loing was composed of 14 communes:

Champagne-sur-Seine
Dormelles
Écuelles
Épisy
Montarlot
Montigny-sur-Loing
Moret-sur-Loing
Saint-Mammès
Thomery
Veneux-les-Sablons
Vernou-la-Celle-sur-Seine
Villecerf
Villemer
Ville-Saint-Jacques

See also
Cantons of the Seine-et-Marne department
Communes of the Seine-et-Marne department

References

Moret sur Loing
2015 disestablishments in France
States and territories disestablished in 2015